The FY postcode area, also known as the Blackpool postcode area, is a group of eight postcode districts in North West England, within five post towns. These cover the western half of the Fylde plain (to which the letters in the postcode refer) on the west coast of Lancashire, including Blackpool, Thornton-Cleveleys, Poulton-le-Fylde, Fleetwood and Lytham St Annes.

The FY1 district covers Blackpool town centre and suburbs immediately to the north and south, while FY2 covers most of the town's northern areas, primarily Bispham. FY3 covers various suburbs east of the town centre, along with some rural areas east of the town including the village of Staining. FY4 covers the southern suburbs of Blackpool along with a small rural area to the south-east of the town. FY5 covers Thornton-Cleveleys and some of the northernmost suburbs of the Blackpool district. FY6 covers the town of Poulton-le-Fylde and some rural areas to the east, as well as much of the Over Wyre region. FY7 covers the town of Fleetwood, while FY8 covers Lytham St Annes along with some small rural areas to the north and east.



Coverage
The approximate coverage of the postcode districts:

|-
! style="background:#FFFFFF;"|FY0
| style="background:#FFFFFF;"|BLACKPOOL
| style="background:#FFFFFF;"|
| style="background:#FFFFFF;"|non-geographic
|-
! FY1
| BLACKPOOL
| Blackpool Town Centre, North Shore, South Shore 
| Blackpool
|-
! FY2
| BLACKPOOL
| Bispham, Moor Park
| Blackpool
|-
! FY3
| BLACKPOOL
|Grange Park, Layton, Marton, Staining, Stanley Park
| Blackpool, Fylde, Wyre
|-
! FY4
| BLACKPOOL
| Marton, Peel, South Shore, Squires Gate, Starr Gate
| Blackpool, Fylde
|-
! FY5
| THORNTON-CLEVELEYS
| Anchorsholme, Little Bispham, Skippool, Thornton-Cleveleys
| Wyre, Blackpool
|-
! FY6
| POULTON-LE-FYLDE
| Carleton, Hambleton, Knott End-on-Sea, Poulton-le-Fylde,  Preesall, Singleton, Stalmine
| Wyre, Fylde, Blackpool
|-
! FY7
| FLEETWOOD
| Fleetwood, Rossall
| Wyre
|-
! FY8
| LYTHAM ST. ANNES
| Lytham St. Annes, Moss Side
| Fylde
|}
Some regions of the FY5 postcode area such as Little Bispham and Anchorsholme are generally considered to be suburbs of Blackpool due to being in that town's unitary authority area, despite having the Thornton-Cleveleys post town. 

The same applies to a small section of the FY8 area adjacent to Blackpool Airport, which has the Lytham St Annes post town but is generally considered to be in Blackpool, including for the 2011 census.

Map

See also
Postcode Address File
List of postcode areas in the United Kingdom

References

External links
Royal Mail's Postcode Address File
A quick introduction to Royal Mail's Postcode Address File (PAF)

The Fylde
Postcode areas covering North West England